Daksha Nagarkar is an Indian actress and model who appears in Telugu films. She made her debut in 2014 with AK Rao PK Rao and went onto star in Hora Hori, Husharu and Zombie Reddy.

Early life
Daksha Nagarkar was born in Mumbai, Maharashtra to a Rajput mother and Maratha father. She was brought up in various places including Panchgani, Hyderabad, Bangalore and Delhi as she used to stay with her mother who worked in cosmetic company. Nagarkar initially aspired to become a cardiologist as she comes from a family of doctors, however, she later pursued a career in modelling and acting.

Career
Daksha nagarkar made her debut with Hora Hori (2015) directed by Teja. Reviewing her performance, Sangeetha Devi Dundoo of The Hindu wrote: "Daksha has a reasonably good screen presence and shows promise." Owing the film's shoot, Nagarkar could not attend her first year final exams and failed. Subsequently, she decided to take a break from films and complete her graduation in Bachelor of Business Administration.

Three years later, Nagarkar returned to cinema with the coming of age film Husharu (2018). A 123telugu.com reviewer stated: "Daksha Nagarkar looks natural and is very good in her role."

In 2021, she played a youngster addicted to gaming in Zombie Reddy. A critic from The Hindu called her performance "effective" while Firstpost Hemanth Kumar wrote that Nagarkar got her share of glory in the action-filled moments. In 2022, Nagarkar appeared in the dance number "Entha Sakkagundiro" in Bangarraju, alongside Naga Chaitanya. Later that year, she has signed to appear in the Ravi Teja-starrer Ravanasura.

Filmography

 All films are in Telugu unless otherwise noted.

References

External links

Living people
Date of birth missing (living people)
Actresses from Mumbai
Female models from Mumbai
21st-century Indian actresses
Actresses in Telugu cinema
Marathi actors
Year of birth missing (living people)